is a Japanese speed skater. She competed in two events at the 1994 Winter Olympics.

References

1971 births
Living people
Japanese female speed skaters
Olympic speed skaters of Japan
Speed skaters at the 1994 Winter Olympics
People from Tomakomai, Hokkaido
20th-century Japanese women